The ceremonial county of South Yorkshire
is divided into 14 parliamentary constituencies
– 7 borough constituencies
and 7 county constituencies.

Sheffield Hallam was the only non-Labour South Yorkshire seat for many years, and was held by Nick Clegg for 12 years, until Labour gained the seat in 2017. For a 22-year period spanning 1997–2019, the Conservatives had no seats in South Yorkshire, until the 2019 election, when they gained three. In the 1980s, the region's socialist activity (particularly in local government) led to it being referred to as the "People's Republic of South Yorkshire", it being dominated by Labour, a party with a strong socialist tradition. However, it was not until 2017 that every seat in South Yorkshire was won by Labour, a feat which was not repeated at the subsequent 2019 election.

Constituencies

2010 boundary changes 
Under the Fifth Periodic Review of Westminster constituencies, the Boundary Commission for England decided to reduce the number of seats in South Yorkshire from 15 to 14, leading to significant changes. Barnsley East and Mexborough, Barnsley West and Penistone, Sheffield, Brightside, and Sheffield, Hillsborough were abolished and replaced by Barnsley East, Penistone and Stocksbridge, and Sheffield, Brightside and Hillsborough. Sheffield, Attercliffe was renamed Sheffield South East, and Wentworth was renamed Wentworth and Dearne.

Proposed boundary changes 
See 2023 Periodic Review of Westminster constituencies for further details.

Following the abandonment of the Sixth Periodic Review (the 2018 review), the Boundary Commission for England formally launched the 2023 Review on 5 January 2021. Initial proposals were published on 8 June 2021 and, following two periods of public consultation, revised proposals were published on 8 November 2022. Final proposals will be published by 1 July 2023.

The commission has proposed that South Yorkshire be combined with Humberside as a sub-region of the Yorkshire and the Humber Region, resulting in the creation of a new cross-county boundary constituency named Doncaster East and Axholme, largely replacing Don Valley. Barnsley Central and Barnsley East would be realigned to form Barnsley North and Barnsley South. Changes to Wentworth and Dearne would result in it being renamed Rawmarsh and Conisbrough.

The following constituencies are proposed:

Containing electoral wards from Barnsley
Barnsley North
Barnsley South
Penistone and Stocksbridge (part)
Containing electoral wards from Doncaster
Doncaster East and Axholme (part also in North Lincolnshire)
Doncaster North
Doncaster Central
Rawmarsh and Conisbrough (part)
Containing electoral wards from Rotherham
Rawmarsh and Conisbrough (part)
Rother Valley
Rotherham
Containing electoral wards from Sheffield
Penistone and Stocksbridge (part)
Sheffield Brightside and Hillsborough
Sheffield Central
Sheffield Hallam
Sheffield Heeley
Sheffield South East

Results history
Primary data source: House of Commons research briefing - General election results from 1918 to 2019

2019 
The number of votes cast for each political party who fielded candidates in constituencies comprising South Yorkshire in the 2019 general election were as follows:

Percentage votes 

11983 & 1987 - SDP-Liberal Alliance

* Included in Other

Seats 

11983 & 1987 - SDP-Liberal Alliance

Maps

Historical representation by party
A cell marked → (with a different colour background to the preceding cell) indicates that the previous MP continued to sit under a new party name.

See also
 List of parliamentary constituencies in Yorkshire and the Humber

Notes

References

 
Yorkshire, South
Politics of South Yorkshire
Parliamentary constituencies